Patricius may refer to:

People
Patricius (Caesar), a caesar of the Eastern Roman Empire
 Patricius (consul 500), prominent East Roman general and consul
Patricius (jurist), 5th-century Roman jurist
 Patricius (usurper) (died 352), leader of the Jewish revolt against Gallus
 Patricius (fl. 354AD), father of Augustine of Hippo
Saint Patrick, Christian missionary and patron saint of Ireland
 Franciscus Patricius (1529-1597), Croatian-Venetian Platonist philosopher and scientist

Other uses
 Patricius (butterfly), a genus of gossamer-winged butterflies.
 Patrician (ancient Rome), a rank in the Roman Republic and in the Roman Empire
 Patrikios, a title in the Later Roman Empire

See also
 Dinu Patriciu, Romanian businessman

 Patrician (disambiguation)

Human name disambiguation pages

el:Πατρίκιος (αποσαφήνιση)